Angelė Rupšienė (née Jankūnaitė; born 27 June 1952 in Vilnius, Lithuanian SSR) is a retired Lithuanian professional basketball player, who most notably played for BC Kibirkštis Vilnius. She won two gold medals in the 1976 Montreal Olympic games and 1980 Moscow Olympic games, three gold medals during European Championship and two gold medals during World Championship, playing for Soviet Union national basketball team.

References
 
 Biography and Achievements

1952 births
Living people
Basketball players at the 1976 Summer Olympics
Basketball players at the 1980 Summer Olympics
Guards (basketball)
Lithuanian Sportsperson of the Year winners
Lithuanian women's basketball players
Medalists at the 1976 Summer Olympics
Medalists at the 1980 Summer Olympics
Olympic basketball players of the Soviet Union
Olympic gold medalists for the Soviet Union
Olympic medalists in basketball
Soviet women's basketball players